Cirrholovenia is a genus of cnidarians belonging to the family Cirrholoveniidae.

The species of this genus are found in all oceans.

Species:

Cirrholovenia polynema 
Cirrholovenia reticulata 
Cirrholovenia tetranema 
Cirrholovenia violacea

References

Leptothecata
Cnidarian families